Hugh Oakeley Arnold-Forster PC (19 August 1855 – 12 March 1909), known as H. O. Arnold-Forster, was a British politician and writer. He notably served as Secretary of State for War from 1903 in Balfour's Conservative government until December 1905.

Background and education
Arnold-Forster was the son of William Delafield Arnold, Director of Public Instruction in Punjab, and grandson of Thomas Arnold, of Rugby. When his father died in 1859, he was adopted by William Edward Forster and his wife Jane, who was his father's sister. He was educated at Rugby and University College, Oxford, from which he graduated with first class honours.  He was called to the bar in 1879.

Political career 

Arnold-Forster acted as private secretary to his adoptive father, who became Chief Secretary for Ireland in 1880. He joined Cassell & Co. in 1885, for whom he prepared educational manuals, including the "Citizen Reader" series. He was secretary of the Imperial Federation League from 1884.

Arnold-Forster sat as Liberal Unionist Member of Parliament for West Belfast from 1892 to 1906 and Unionist member for Croydon from 1906 until his death. He served as Parliamentary and Financial Secretary to the Admiralty under Lord Salisbury and Arthur Balfour from 1900 to 1903. As such, he was during August 1902 invited by German authorities to tour the dockyards and naval establishments in Kiel and Wilhelmshaven and several of the great private shipyards in the country. Balfour appointed him to Secretary of State for War (with a seat in the cabinet) in 1903, and he served as such until 1905, during which time he reorganized the War Office (see Esher Report). In 1903 he was sworn of the Privy Council. During the Army reforms he clashed with Lord Esher, the King's minister attendant.  He complained to the Prime Minister that he was being circumvented by an unelected and unaccountable authority vested in the royal prerogative.  Balfour's proposal, to annexe some of the royal prerogatives, was partly because of the challenge to the post of Commander-in-Chief which was abolished as a royal sinecure.  Arnold-Foster was frequently ignored at cabinet meetings, as decisions had been taken behind his back by courtiers moving in military circles.

Family
Arnold-Forster married Mary Lucy Story-Maskelyne (1861–1951), daughter of Nevil Story Maskelyne and Thereza Dillwyn Llewelyn (Welsh astronomer and pioneer in scientific photography) in 1885. They had four sons, of whom his Times obituary states "the eldest is just beginning to practise as an artist, and the youngest is a naval cadet." They were:

 William Edward Arnold-Forster (8 May 1886 – 1951) artist, author and Labour politician, married Katherine "Ka" Laird Cox in 1918. She was the former lover of Rupert Brooke.  Their son was Mark Arnold-Forster.  After Cox's death, he married Ruth Mallory, widow of George Mallory, the mountaineer.
Mervyn Nevill Arnold-Forster (21 March 1888 – 6 May 1927)
John Anthony Arnold-Forster (20 September 1889 – 1958), married Daphne Mansel-Pleydell in 1919.  Vanda Morton, biographer of Nevil Story Maskelyne, is their daughter.
Hugh Christopher Arnold-Forster (9 December 1890 – 21 July 1965), who rose to become a Commander in the Royal Navy and served as Deputy Director of Naval Intelligence during the Second World War; married Marcia Buddicom in 1922 and Frances Brown in 1948.

Arnold-Forster died in March 1909, aged fifty-three.

Publications
Arnold-Forster's publications include:

 How to Solve the Irish Land Question
 The Citizen Reader
 The Laws of Everyday Life
 This World of Ours
 In a Conning Tower
 Things New and Old
 Our Home Army
 A History of England
 Army Letters
 The Coming of the Kilogram
 Our Great City
 The Army in 1906: a Policy and a Vindication
 English Socialism of To-Day
 An English View of Irish Secession in Political Science Quarterly (Mar. 1889)
 The Queen's Empire: A Pictorial and Descriptive Record, 2 Volumes, 1899
 Military needs and military policy

References

Bibliography

External links

 

1855 births
1909 deaths
Alumni of University College, Oxford
Secretaries of State for War (UK)
Conservative Party (UK) MPs for English constituencies
Politics of the London Borough of Croydon
UK MPs 1892–1895
UK MPs 1895–1900
UK MPs 1900–1906
UK MPs 1906–1910
Members of the Parliament of the United Kingdom for Belfast constituencies (1801–1922)
British people of Cornish descent
Liberal Unionist Party MPs for Irish constituencies
Members of the Privy Council of the United Kingdom